The 1942 Washington Huskies football team was an American football team that represented the University of Washington during the 1942 college football season. In its first season under head coach Ralph Welch, the team compiled a 4–3–3 record, finished in sixth place in the Pacific Coast Conference, and outscored its opponents by a combined total of 120 to 94. Walt Harrison was the team captain.

Schedule

NFL Draft selections
Five University of Washington Huskies were selected in the 1943 NFL Draft, which lasted 32 rounds with 300 selections.

References

Washington
Washington Huskies football seasons
Washington Huskies football